David Leonard Adelman (born May 15, 1981) is an American professional basketball coach who is the lead assistant coach for the Denver Nuggets of the National Basketball Association (NBA). He is the son of former NBA coach Rick Adelman.

Coaching career 

Adelman began coaching basketball after graduating from Jesuit High School in Portland, Oregon, where he stayed to become a volunteer assistant coach under Gene Potter from 2002–2006. He then became the head coach at Lincoln High School, leading the Cardinals to three city championships (2006–'07, 2009–'10, 2010–'11) and reaching the 6A championships where the Cardinals found themselves losing to none other than Jesuit High.

NBA career 

In 2011, Adelman joined the Minnesota Timberwolves as a player development coach under father Rick Adelman. After Rick retired in 2014, Adelman continued on with Minnesota, becoming the head coach for the NBA Summer League for three seasons under Flip Saunders (died in 2015) and then Sam Mitchell. Adelman left the Timberwolves in 2016 where he joined the Orlando Magic as an assistant coach under Frank Vogel for one season. Signing on with the Denver Nuggets prior to the '17–'18 season, Adelman is in his fifth season in Denver, currently serving as the lead assistant coach under Michael Malone.

Personal life 

Born to Mary Kay and Rick Adelman in Salem, Oregon, Adelman is one of six siblings, three of whom also went into coaching basketball. Kathy Adelman Naro is a highly regarded girls’ high school coach in Oregon. Pat Adelman led the boys at Lincoln High School to the class 6A semifinals in 2018.  R.J. Adelman worked a range of jobs including assistant coach, scout, and video coordinator in Seattle, Sacramento, Houston, and Minnesota before passing away unexpectedly in 2018. Sisters Laura and Caitlin reside in Oregon.

Highlights and awards 

Won a state championship as a player at Jesuit High School in 1999.
Led Jesuit High School to a state title in 2005.
83–53 (.610) record with Lincoln High School. Led the Cardinals to three city championships (2006–'07, 2009–'10, 2010–'11). Additionally, reached the 6A Championship game in 2009.
Named PIL Coach of the Year three times.
Assistant coach in the 2019 NBA All Stars game.
Traveled to the 2020 NBA Bubble in Orlando, Florida where the Denver Nuggets became the first team in NBA history to overcome two subsequent 3–1 deficits in the postseason. The Nuggets lost in Game 5 to the Los Angeles Lakers who went on to win the 2020 Championship.

References 

1981 births
Living people
University of Portland alumni
Portland State University alumni
Jesuit High School (Beaverton, Oregon) alumni
Sportspeople from Salem, Oregon
Minnesota Timberwolves assistant coaches
Basketball coaches from Oregon
Denver Nuggets assistant coaches
Sportspeople from Portland, Oregon
Orlando Magic assistant coaches